Ali Akbar Mohtashamipur or Mohtashami (‎; 30 August 1947 – 7 June 2021) was an Iranian Shia cleric who was active in the 1979 Iranian Revolution and later became interior minister of the Islamic Republic of Iran. He is "seen as a founder of the Hezbollah movement in Lebanon" and one of the "radical elements advocating the export of the revolution," in the Iranian clerical hierarchy.

In an Israeli assassination attempt targeting Mohtashami, he lost his right hand when he  opened a book loaded with explosives. In June 2021, he died from COVID-19 during the COVID-19 pandemic in Iran.

Biography
Mohtashemi studied in the holy city of Najaf Iraq, where he spent considerable time with his mentor Ayatollah Khomeini. During the 1970s he received military training in a Fatah camp in Lebanon and lived in a remote village, Yammoune, in the Beqaa valley. He also accompanied Khomeini during his period in exile in both Iraq and France. He co-founded an armed group in the 1970s with Mohammad Montazeri, son of Ayatollah Hossein Ali Montazeri, in Lebanon and Syria, aiming at assisting liberation movements in Muslim countries.

Following the Iranian revolution he served as Iran's ambassador to Syria from 1982 to 1986. He later became Iran's minister of interior. While ambassador to Syria, he is thought to have played a "pivotal role" in the creation of the Lebanese radical Shia organization Hezbollah, working "within the framework of the Department for Islamic Liberation Movements run by the Iranian Pasdaran." Mohtashami "actively supervised" Hezbollah's creation, merging into it existing radical Shi'ite movements; the Lebanese al-Dawa; Islamic Amal; Islamic Jihad Organization; Imam Hussein Suicide Squad, Jundallah and  the Association of Muslim Students. In 1986 his "close supervision" of Hezbollah was cut short when the Office of Islamic Liberation was reassigned to Iran's ministry of foreign affairs. He is also described as having made "liberal" use of the diplomatic pouch as Ambassador, bringing in "crates" of material from Iran.
He remained among radical hard line parties even when he was chosen as the minister of the interior in the government of Khomeni.

In 1989 the new Iranian president Akbar Hashemi Rafsanjani ousted Mohtashami from the Lebanon desk of the Iranian ministry of foreign affairs and replaced him with his brother Mahmud Hashemi. This was seen as an indication of Iran's downgrading of its support for Hezbollah and for a revolutionary foreign policy in general.

In August 1991 he regained some of his influence when he became chairman of the defense committee of the Majlis (parliament) of Iran.

More controversially, Mohtashami is thought
to have played an active role, with the Pasdaran and Syrian military intelligence, in the supervision of Hezbollah's suicide bomb attacks against the American embassy in Beirut in April 1983, the American and French contingents of the MNF in October 1983 and the American embassy annex in September 1984,New York Times, 2 November 1983; and 5 October 1984

and to have been instrumental in the killing of Lt. Col. William R. Higgins, the American Chief of the United Nations Truce Supervision Organization's (UNTSO) observer group in Lebanon who was taken hostage on 17 February 1988 by Lebanese pro-Iranian Shia radicals. The killing of Higgins is said to have come "from orders issued by Iranian radicals, most notably Mohtashemi," in an effort to prevent "improvement in the U.S.–Iranian relationship." It also came from alleged involvement in the December 1988 bombing of Pan AM Flight 103. The US Defense Intelligence Agency alleges that Ali Akbar Mohtashamipur (Ayatollah Mohtashemi), a member of the Iranian government, paid US$10 million for the bombing:

While Mohtashami was a strong opponent of Western influence in the Muslim world and of the existence of the state of Israel, he was also a supporter and advisor of reformist Iranian president Mohammad Khatami who is famous for having championed free expression and civil rights. Mohtashemi was in the Western news again in 2000, not as a hardline radical but for refusing to appear in court in Iran after his pro-reform newspaper, Bayan, was banned.

Behzad Nabavi and Ali Akbar Mohtashami were among those who were prevented by the Guardian council from taking part in the elections of Majlis.

Attempted assassination
In 1984, after the Beirut bombings, Mohtashami received a parcel containing a book on Shia holy places when he was serving as Iranian ambassador to Damascus. As he opened the package it detonated, blowing off his hand and severely wounding him. Mohtashami was medevaced to Europe and survived the blast to continue his work. The identity of the perpetrators of the attack was long unknown, but in 2018 Ronen Bergman, in his book Rise and Kill First, revealed that the Israelis were behind the assassination attempt. The Israeli Prime Minister,  Yitzhak Shamir personally signed the assassination order, after being given them by Mossad director Nahum Admoni.

Death
He died on 7 June 2021, aged 74, at Khatam ol-Anbia Hospital in Tehran of complications related to COVID-19.

References

Bibliography

Ranstorp, Magnus, Hizb'allah in Lebanon : The Politics of the Western Hostage Crisis, New York, St. Martins Press, 1997
Wright, Robin, Sacred Rage, Simon and Schuster, 2001

External links

Tehran, Washington, and Terror: No Agreemnt to Differ
Analysis: Iran Sends Terror-Group Supporters To Arafat's Funeral Procession 12 November 2004
How Hezbollah Founder Fell Foul of Iranian Regime  8 July 2010

1947 births
2021 deaths
Politicians from Tehran
Interior Ministers of Iran
Iranian Shia clerics
Ambassadors of Iran to Syria
Association of Combatant Clerics politicians
Survivors of terrorist attacks
Iranian politicians with disabilities
People without hands
Iranian amputees
Heads of reformist fractions in Islamic Consultative Assembly
Iranian campaign managers
Hezbollah
Deaths from the COVID-19 pandemic in Iran
21st-century Iranian politicians